Arbela elegantula is a species of African damsel bug in the family Nabidae.

Subspecies
Arbela elegantula  elegantula  Stål 1866 (from Réunion, Madagascar, Seychelles, Tanzania, Zambia, Congo)
Arbela elegantula occidentalis  Kerzhner, 1986 (from Cameroun, Congo, Ethiopia, Gabon, Moroccos; Senegal, Ivory Coast)

References
Kerzhner, 1986. African Species of the Genus Arbela (Heteroptera, Nabidae)

Nabidae
Hemiptera of Africa
Insects described in 1866